Landulf of Milan was a late eleventh-century historian of Milan. His work Historiae Mediolanensis contains a proportion of pure invention, as well as gross inaccuracies. He is called Landulf Senior to distinguish him from the unrelated chronicler of Milan Landulf Junior.

He was a married priest and opponent of the Gregorian Reform and the local Patarenes. He travelled to France to study: to Orléans in 1103, to Paris to study with William of Champeaux in 1107-7, and to Laon.

His chronicle begins in 374 and concludes in 1083. There is a complete Italian translation by Alessandro Visconti.

Notes

External links
Alessandro Visconti, La cronaca Milanese di Landolfo seniore sec. XI (Milan, 1928)
Details about Landulf's Historia (in German) https://www.geschichtsquellen.de/werk/3258
Edition in the MGH

Italian chroniclers
Writers from Milan
11th-century Italian historians
11th-century Latin writers
11th-century Italian Roman Catholic priests